The Tenancy Deposit Schemes (Scotland) Regulations 2011 came into force on 7 March 2011. Every landlord or letting agent that receives a deposit in Scotland must register with their local authority and join a tenancy deposit scheme.

There are three tenancy deposit schemes in Scotland: the Letting Protection Service Scotland, Safedeposits Scotland and My|deposits Scotland.

Reasons for introduction 
Scots law gives tenants extra protection against losing their deposits. It means landlords and letting agents cannot keep deposits, instead they have to transfer them to a government approved third party.

The regulation has come into force to prevent "unscrupulous" landlords withholding part or all of a deposit when the tenant leaves their accommodation. The Scottish Housing Minister, Keith Brown, estimated that up to 11,000 tenants each year have had their deposit wrongly retained by their landlord or letting agent. 
The tenancy deposit schemes approved by the government means that any deposit dispute between tenant and landlord can be referred to an independent dispute resolution service.

Regulations 
Concerns that some private landlords unfairly withhold tenants' deposits led to provisions in the Housing (Scotland) Act 2006, for Scottish Ministers to bring forward regulations for the approval of tenancy deposit schemes in Scotland. The Regulations set out the conditions that all schemes must meet before they can be approved by the Scottish Ministers. The three independent third party schemes approved by Scottish Ministers operating in Scotland are:
 The Letting Protection Service Scotland
 SafeDeposits Scotland
 My|deposits Scotland

Deadlines 

Table of Tenancy Deposit Deadlines for Scottish Landlords:

Enforcement 
A tenant can take a landlord to court if they don't protect their deposit with a scheme or provide the required information within the specified timescales. If the court is satisfied that the landlord has not complied, a sheriff can order the landlord to pay up to three times the deposit.

See also
 Rent control in Scotland
 Damage deposit

References

External links 
 Safeguarding Tenancy Deposits: scotland.gov
 Table of Tenancy Deposit Deadlines for Scottish Landlords: Domino Letting Website
 My Deposits Scotland: Micro with key terms and conditions on Lettingweb Website

2011 establishments in Scotland
2011 in British politics
Affordable housing
Housing in Scotland
Insurance in the United Kingdom
Insurance legislation
Landlord–tenant law
Renting
Scots property law
Types of insurance